A mechanoid is a robot designed to look and act like a human.

Mechanoid may also refer to:

 The Mechanoids, a 1991 comic book series adapted from The Mechanoid Invasion, a role playing game
 The Mechanoids, a 1985 role-playing game supplement for The Mechanoid Invasion
 Mechanoids, fictional characters in the 1985 video game Mercenary
 Mechanoids, fictional characters in the 2018 video game RimWorld

See also

 Mechonoids, fictional robots from Doctor Who
 Mechanoid Army, a line of action figures by McFarlane Toys